Philibert Joseph Roux (April 26, 1780 – March 24, 1854) was a French surgeon born in Auxerre.

Trained as a military surgeon, he later moved to Paris, where he was a student and friend of Xavier Bichat (1771–1802). In 1806, he became a surgeon at the Hôpital Beaujon, and in 1810 was assigned to the Hôpital de la Charité. In 1835, he succeeded Guillaume Dupuytren (1777–1835) as chief surgeon at Hôtel-Dieu de Paris.

Remembered for his pioneer work in plastic surgery, in 1819 he performed one of the earliest staphylorrhaphies (surgical repair of a cleft palate). He is also credited with being the first surgeon to suture a ruptured female perineum (1832).

A collection of his papers is held at the National Library of Medicine in Bethesda, Maryland.

Selected writings 
 Nouveaux élémens de médecine opératoire, 1813 - New elements of operative medicine.
 Memoire sur la staphyloraphie, ou suture du voile du palais, 1825 - Memoir on the staphylorraphy, or suture of the soft palate.
 "A Narrative of a Journey to London in 1814, or, A parallel of the English and French surgery".

References

External links 
The Medical times and gazette Biographical Sketch of M. Roux
An introduction to the history of medicine by Fielding Hudson Garrison

French surgeons
Members of the French Academy of Sciences
People from Yonne
1780 births
1854 deaths